Turn Back Time may refer to:

 "Turn Back Time" (Aqua song), 1998
 "Turn Back Time" (Sub Focus song), 2013
 Turn Back Time (TV series), a 2006 British television series
 Turn Back Time – The High Street, a 2010 British documentary series

See also
 "If I Could Turn Back Time", a 1989 song by Cher
 "Turn Back the Hands of Time", a 1970 song by Tyrone Davis
 "If I Could Turn Back the Hands of Time", a 1999 song by R. Kelly